1956–57 was the 11th season of the Western International Hockey League.

Standings

 Spokane Flyers	        31-17-0	250-181
 Trail Smoke Eaters	31-17-0	213-170
 Nelson Maple Leafs	20-28-0	194-241
 Rossland Warriors	14-34-0	163-228

Semi finals

Best of 7

 Rossland 7 Spokane 4
 Spokane 2 Rossland 1
 Spokane 3 Rossland 2
 Spokane 2 Rossland 1
 Spokane 5 Rossland 2

Spokane Flyers beat Rossland Warriors 4 wins to 1.

 Trail 4 Nelson 2
 Trail 5 Nelson 4
 Trail 4 Nelson 3
 Nelson 6 Trail 2
 Trail 5 Nelson 1

Trail Smoke Eaters beat Nelson Maple Leafs 4 wins to 1.

Final

Best of 7

 Spokane 5 Trail 3
 Spokane 9 Trail 3
 Spokane 6 Trail 1
 Spokane 3 Trail 1

Spokane Flyers beat Trail Smoke Eaters 4 wins to none.

Spokane Flyers advanced to the 1956-57 British Columbia Senior Playoffs.

References 

https://news.google.com/newspapers?nid=1338&dat=19561002&id=pp8SAAAAIBAJ&sjid=5_YDAAAAIBAJ&pg=2866,614432
https://news.google.com/newspapers?nid=1338&dat=19561211&id=QaspAAAAIBAJ&sjid=5PYDAAAAIBAJ&pg=820,2840117

Western International Hockey League seasons
Wihl
Wihl